Afghanistan competed at the 2022 World Games held in Birmingham, United States from 7 to 17 July 2022.

Competitors
The following is the list of number of competitors in the Games.

Muaythai

Afghanistan entered three competitors in Muay Thai.

Men

Women

References

Nations at the 2022 World Games
2022
World Games